is a passenger railway station  located in  Nada-ku, Kobe, Hyōgo Prefecture, Japan. It is operated by the West Japan Railway Company (JR West).

Lines

Station layout
The station consists of two elevated island platforms with the station building underneath; however, only the inner tracks are normally used, with the outer tracks reserved for passing express trains except during peak commuting hours. The station has a Midori no Madoguchi staffed ticket office.

Platforms

Adjacent stations

History
Rokkōmichi Station opened on 20 July 1934.  With the privatization of the Japan National Railways (JNR) on 1 April 1987, the station came under the aegis of the West Japan Railway Company. Due to the Great Hanshin earthquake of 17 January 1995, the first floor of the station building, which had just been rebuilt several years previously, collapsed along with the elevated tracks. Restoration work was completed by 1 April of the same year.

Station numbering was introduced in March 2018 with Rokkōmichi being assigned station number JR-A58.

Passenger statistics
In fiscal 2019, the station was used by an average of 26,441 passengers daily

Surrounding area
Nada Ward Office 
Kobe University
Kobe Shoin Women's College Junior College Division
Shinwa Junior High School/Shinwa Girls' High School
Rokkomichi Minami Park (Completed on September 15, 2005 as part of Kobe City's post-earthquake reconstruction and redevelopment project)

See also
List of railway stations in Japan

References

External links 

 Rokkōmichi Station from JR-Odekake.net 

Railway stations in Japan opened in 1934
Tōkaidō Main Line
Railway stations in Kobe